Carmen Nebel (born 24 July 1956 in Grimma, then East Germany) is a German television presenter.

Nebel majored in German studies, English studies and pedagogy at Humboldt University of Berlin. After completing her degree she began appearing on GDR television, working for Deutscher Fernsehfunk (DFF) throughout the 1980s. In 1989 she hosted her own television show Sprungbrett. After the fall of the Berlin Wall and German reunification she worked for German broadcasters ARD, NDR and MDR. From June 1994 to 2003 she presented the Schlager show Feste der Volksmusik on ARD. She has been presenting Willkommen bei Carmen Nebel and Die schönsten Weihnachts-Hits since January 2004 on ZDF. Nebel lives in Berlin and has one child.

Awards 
 2006: Goldene Kamera
 2009: Order of Merit of the Federal Republic of Germany

External links 
 
 ZDF:Biography Carmen Nebel

References 

1956 births
Living people
People from Grimma
German television presenters
German women television presenters
German television personalities
Schlager musicians
Recipients of the Cross of the Order of Merit of the Federal Republic of Germany
Humboldt University of Berlin alumni
ARD (broadcaster) people
ZDF people
Norddeutscher Rundfunk people